Luigi Stefanini (1891-1956) was an Italian philosopher.

References

1891 births
1956 deaths
People from Treviso
20th-century Italian philosophers